This is a list of Jewish communities in the United Kingdom, including synagogues, yeshivot and Hebrew schools. For a list of buildings which were previously used as synagogues see List of former synagogues in the United Kingdom.

England

East of England

Cambridge and East Anglia

East Midlands

Essex

Hertfordshire

Greater London and Surrey

Central London

City of London and the East End

East and North East London

North and North West London

South and South East London

South West London and Surrey

West London

North East England

North West England

Blackpool and Lytham St Annes

Liverpool

Greater Manchester

Southport

South East England

Kent

Sussex

South West England

West Midlands

Yorkshire

Leeds

Scotland

Edinburgh

Greater Glasgow

Elsewhere

Wales

Northern Ireland

See also
List of former synagogues in the United Kingdom
List of Jewish communities by country
Isle of Man Jewish Community (Manx Hebrew Congregation)
History of the Jews in Gibraltar
History of the Jews in Guernsey
History of the Jews in Jersey
Federation of Synagogues
Liberal Judaism
Masorti Judaism
Movement for Reform Judaism
Scottish Council of Jewish Communities
Union of Orthodox Hebrew Congregations
United Synagogue

Notes

References

External links
 Chabad-Lubavitch Centres in England
 Chabad-Lubavitch Centres in Scotland
 Federation of Synagogues communities
 Hebrew Synagogue
 JCR-UK (Jewish Communities & Records – United Kingdom) for a complete list of synagogues (past and present) in the United Kingdom
 Jewish Small Communities Network: information relating to Jewish small communities across the UK from all parts of the Jewish spectrum
 Jewish Travel Advisor: Synagogues in London
 Liberal Judaism: communities list
 Maccabi GB: sporting, educational, social and health and wellbeing activities in Britain's Jewish community
 Masorti Judaism communities
 Movement for Reform Judaism synagogues
 The S&P Sephardi Community
 United Synagogue communities

Jewish schools in the United Kingdom
United Kingdom
Jewish
Orthodox yeshivas in the United Kingdom